Wanda Jackson in Person is a live album by American recording artist Wanda Jackson. It was released in October 1969 via Capitol Records and contained ten tracks. The project was Jackson's first live album in her career and was recorded at Mr. Lucky's, a performance venue in Phoenix, Arizona.

Background
In the 1950s, Wanda Jackson released a series of Rockabilly recordings before transitioning into the Country genre during the 1960s, where she had commercial success. As the decade progressed, Jackson recorded more country material and became further identified with the genre. Jackson and her producer, Ken Nelson, decided to record her first live album after deciding that she needed to attempt other musical projects. Two dates were set for the recording of the project at Mr. Lucky's, a performance venue located in Phoenix, Arizona where she "always had great crowds", according to Jackson's autobiography.

Recording, content and release
For the recording process, Jackson used her touring band but also brought in Nashville session musicians Willie Ackerman and Fred Carter Jr. The official sessions took place in July 1969 at Mr. Lucky's under Nelson's production. A total of ten tracks were chosen for the live recording, which included Jackson's self-penned hit "Right or Wrong". Other songs chosen included her Rockabilly single "Let's Have a Party", along with her country single "If I Had a Hammer". She also performed several covers, including Tammy Wynette's "Divorce", along with Johnny Cash and June Carter's "Jackson". Wanda Jackson in Person was released in October 1969 on Capitol Records as a vinyl LP. In later decades, the album was re-released to digital and streaming markets, including Apple Music.

Track listings

Vinyl version

Digital version

Personnel
All credits are adapted from the liner notes of Wanda Jackson in Person.

Musical personnel
 Willie Ackerman – Drums
 Earl Ball – Piano
 Fred Carter Jr. – Electric guitar
 Wanda Jackson – Lead vocals
 Billy Linneman – Bass
 Stanley Oscarson – Steel guitar
 Billy Williams – Rhythm guitar

Technical personnel
 Hugh Davies – Engineer
 Ken Nelson – Producer

Release history

References

1969 live albums
Albums produced by Ken Nelson (United States record producer)
Capitol Records live albums
Wanda Jackson live albums